José Esquivel (June 10, 1935 – December 12, 2022) was a Chicano artist and activist based in San Antonio, Texas who was known for his work in challenging Anglo-American stereotypes of Mexican Americans and life in Chicano barrios. His work was connected to the Chicano Movement and it is included in various prominent collections. Esquivel was also a co-founder of the Con Safo art group.

Biography and Training 
According to his obituary, the artist was the son of José and Elvira Esquivel. He was pre-deceased by Maria Inez Esquivel, his wife of 55 years.

Esquivel attended the Technical and Vocational High School in San Antonio, where he studied with Katherine Alsup, who entered his work in many competitions. Alsup also helped Esquivel win a scholarship to the Warren Hunter School of Art in 1954, where he received his certificate in Graphics and Watercolor Painting in 1958. With the skills Esquivel learned from Hunter, he had the ability to earn a living as a commercial artist.

Esquivel won the San Antonio Fiesta Commission flag design competition held in 1966. That design is still used on flags today. In 1987, he won the competition to provide a floral backdrop design at San Fernando Cathedral for Pope John Paul II's papal visit to San Antonio.

Career

The Con Safo Group and the Chicano Movement 
n 1968, Esquivel was one of the six cofounders of the Con Safo art group, initially known as El Grupo or El Grupo Seis. The other original members of the San Antonio based group were Felipe Reyes (b. 1944, the principal organizer), Jesse Almazán (b. 1937 – d. 2002), José Garza (b. 1947 – d. 2021), Jesse “Chista” Cantú (b. 1935 – d. 2018), and Roberto Ríos (b. 1941).  The group also used the names Los Pintores de Aztlán and Los Pintores de la Nueva Raza. In December of 1971, Cantú was excluded from the group because of his activism. Mel Casas (1929-2014) and Jesse Treviño (1946-2023) joined the group at that time, and the name Con Safo was adopted.

Esquivel explains how the Chicano movement affected him: "Before the Chicano movement, we had no politicians who would stand up to the system. We basically stayed in our place. We did nothing about our condition — we accepted things as they were. Until MAYO [the Mexican American Youth Organization] under José Angel Gutiérrez led the student rebellions, we accepted the white man’s rule. . . . You know where you belong and where you don’t. I didn’t go out of the barrio very much. I hate to make this comparison, but it was like training a dog. You just wouldn’t dare go most places! 

In 1977, Esquivel's work was featured in the "Dale Gas" Chicano Art Exhibition at the Houston Contemporary Arts Museum.

In 1977, his work was influential in the establishment of the Centro Cultural Aztlan. His work is featured in the National Museum of Mexican Art and requested to be archived at the Smithsonian. His work has been shown at various university exhibits.

Notable works 
His painting Garcia’s Grocery Store, 1962 (private collection), a barrio store in the snow, featured the slogan (“Henry B. to D.C.”) that Henry B. Gonzalez used in his congressional campaign.

His ink drawing Untitled,1967, (private collection) features a surreal tableau that mysteriously appears on a tree stump.

His mixed media work La Cruz, 1970, (20 x 30 inches, collection of the artist’s estate) features a cross with rays of light and surreal elements at the top. 

His watercolor Puffying Away, 1970 (20 x 23 inches, collection of the artist’s estate) is an early anti-pollution work.

His watercolor West of Town, 1970 (22 3/8 x 27 3/8 inches, San Antonio Museum of Art, gift of Mr. and Mrs. Robert Willson), is an important work of political advocacy that advances an activist slate of Chicano candidates.

His watercolor Cowboy Rhythm, 1970 (20 x 30 inches, private collection), hearkens back to the first Con Safo group exercises and exhibitions in 1968, which treated Cowboys as Americana. These forms also developed into Southwest Landscape.

His mixed media painting Farm Workers, 1971 (Santos Martinez Chicano Art Collection) is a remarkable rendering of a family of farm laborers synthesized into a fruit-bearing bush. 

His watercolor Cultural Genocide, 1971 (23 x 29 inches, private collection) features a strange "creature [that] is suggested in the center, with prominent ribs. The lower body and the hind leg in the lower right suggest a quadruped, presumably a beast of burden. But the two human-looking arms that reach out in the lower left corner contradict this reading. The implication is that humans are laboring like beasts of burden." 

His watercolor Southwest Landscape, 1973 or 1971 (20 x 30 inches, private collection) shows workers "so accustomed to stoop labor that they appear to be quadrupeds planted into the earth. They seem to exist in a dreamlike state, hypnotized or locked in suspended animation, perhaps awaiting a social and political awakening that will set them free. Meanwhile, embryos mature like sprouting seeds in the background hills (C/S, 2009, p. 42)."

His watercolor Abuelita, 1972 (20 x 30 inches, private collection), "could symbolize migration to the cold north."

His Con Safo Graphic, 1972, was used as the cover image for a group publication for the July, 1972 group exhibition at the Mexican American Cultural Center (MACC) at the Assumption Cultural Center in San Antonio.

His watercolor La Raza Growing Wings, 1973 (20 x 30 inches, private collection) alludes to growing Chicano consciousness.

His pencil drawing El Caballo, 1973 (20 x 30 inches, the artist’s estate), punningly has a horse metmorphose out of cigarette smoke.

His watercolor Labor Rhythms, 2001 (20 x 30 inches, private collection) revisits the forms developed in Southwest Landscape.

His painting El Caballo c/s #2, 2004 (36 x 48 inches, the artist’s estate) recreates his 1973 drawing in paint.

His 

His watercolor Golden Hand was acquired by the City of San Antonio.

His painting Las Nubes, 2016 (30 x 40 inches, collection of the artist’s estate) features produce that helps to hide a UFW eagle. It also features a mestizo head and a subtle image of the Virgin of Guadalupe as a farm worker.

His painting La Tiendita was featured in Xicanx: Dreamers + Changemakers at the Museum of Anthropology at The University of British Columbia.

Personal life 
He worked a full-time job and took freelance work as an artist to support his family.

Esquivel died at Methodist Hospital on December 12, 2022, aged 87.

References 

Chicano art
20th-century American artists
American male painters
Artists from San Antonio
Hispanic and Latino American artists
1935 births
2022 deaths